Željana Zovko (born 25 March 1970) is a Herzegovinian Croat diplomat and politician. Since 2016, she has been serving as a member of the European Parliament from Croatia.

Biography 
Zovko studied French language at the University of North London in the 1990s.

Political and diplomatic career in Bosnia and Herzegovina 
Zovko came back to Bosnia and Herzegovina in 1999 to work as an associate for public relations for the Croat member of the Presidency of Bosnia and Herzegovina Ante Jelavić (HDZ BiH). She then served as head of the cabinet for Croat member of the Presidency of Bosnia and Herzegovina Dragan Čović (HDZ BiH) from 2002 till April 2004.

With his political support, Zovko moved to the diplomatic service: Čović named her as the resident ambassador of Bosnia and Herzegovina to France from April 2004 to 2008. She then moved on as Bosnian ambassador to Spain between 2008 and December 2011.

In 2012 Zovko came back to Bosnian politics, serving until March 2015 as foreign affairs advisor for the Chairman of the Council of Ministers of Bosnia and Herzegovina Vjekoslav Bevanda (HDZ BiH). In the same period, she also served as international secretary for Bosnia and Herzegovina of Croatia's HDZ party.

Despite the conflict of interest due to her dual allegiance as a Bosnia diplomat, in May 2014 Zovko contested the 2014 European Parliament election in Croatia on the list of the "Patriotic coalition" linked to the Croatian Democratic Union. With 2,392 preferential votes, she was not elected.

From August 2015 till November 2016 Zovko served as ambassador of Bosnia and Herzegovina to Italy.

Member of the European Parliament from Croatia
In 2016, following the resignation of Andrej Plenković and Davor Ivo Stier who went on to form a new government in Croatia, and the refusal of Ivan Tepeš to replace Stier, Zovko took up a place in the European Parliament as MEP for Croatia.  Her switch of loyalties from the Bosnian diplomatic service to representing Croatian voters in the European Parliament raised criticisms in the press. During her first term, she served on the Committee on Development (DEVE). She was also a member of the Delegation for relations with BiH and Kosovo (while also holding BiH citizenship), and of the delegations to the joint parliamentary committees with ACP countries, Armenia, Azerbaijan and Georgia. 

Zovko was elected at the 2019 elections, and was appointed vice-chair and EPP vice-coordinator of the Committee on Foreign Affairs. 
She is a member of the Working Groups for the Western Balkans and for external financial instruments as well as a member of the Delegations for relations with Bosnia and Herzegovina and Kosovo, the Delegation for relations with the United States and the Delegation to the Euro-Latin American Parliamentary Assembly. She is also a member in the Committee on Culture and Education and the Subcommittee on Security and Defence.
Zovko is Vice-Chair of the parliamentary delegation for relations with Bosnia and Herzegovina, and Kosovo (DSEE).

In October 2020, she was elected as one of the vice chairs of the Foreign Affairs Committee. In October 2021, she was elected as one of the vice presidents of the EPP Group in the European Parliament.

In 2017 October, Zovko served as chief observer for the EU election observation mission to Nepal during the 2017 Nepalese legislative election, and in 2021 for the EU election observation mission in Honduras.

Awards 
  Grand Cross of the Order of Military Merit (Spain) by King Juan Carlos I (2012)

References

External links
European Parliament MEP profile

Living people
1970 births
Croats of Bosnia and Herzegovina
Croatian Democratic Union of Bosnia and Herzegovina politicians
Croatian Democratic Union politicians
Croatian Democratic Union MEPs
Women MEPs for Croatia
MEPs for Croatia 2014–2019
Politicians from Mostar
MEPs for Croatia 2019–2024